The Metro Manila Film Festival Award for Best Supporting Actor is an award presented annually by the Metropolitan Manila Development Authority (MMDA). It was first awarded at the 1st Metro Manila Film Festival ceremony, held in 1975; Vic Silayan received the award for his role in Diligan Mo ng Hamog ang Uhaw na Lupa and it is given in honor of an actor who has delivered an outstanding performance in a supporting role while working within the film industry. Currently, nominees and winners are determined by Executive Committees, headed by the Metropolitan Manila Development Authority Chairman and key members of the film industry.

Winners and nominees

1970s

1980s

1990s

2000s

2010s

2020s

Multiple awards for Best Supporting Actor
Throughout the history of Metro Manila Film Festival (MMFF), there have been actors who received multiple Awards for Best Supporting Actor. As of 2021 (47th MMFF), 7 actors have received two or more Best Supporting Actor awards.

Notes

References

External links
 IMDB: Metro Manila Film Festival
 Official website of the Metro Manila Film Festival

Supporting Actor
Film awards for supporting actor